The Deutscher Bogensport-Verband (DBSV), formerly the Deutscher Bogenschützen-Verband der DDR, is a nationwide sports association for archery in Germany. Until German reunification in 1990, it was the state-operated governing body for the sport in East Germany and operated under the umbrella of the Deutscher Turn- und Sportbund. During its time as the state governing body for archery, the DBSV participated in the East German Olympic Committee and was a member organization of the World Archery Federation. Like the other handful of East German sports associations that survived reunification, the DBSV has since spread and opened constituent associations in the rest of the nation.

See also
German Shooting and Archery Federation
Deutscher Turn- und Sportbund
East Germany at the Olympics
Doping in East Germany

References

Sports governing bodies in Germany
Sports governing bodies in East Germany
Sports organizations established in 1959
1959 establishments in East Germany